André Muschs (born 10 August 1934) is a Belgian field hockey player. He competed at the 1956, 1960, 1964 and the 1968 Summer Olympics.

References

External links
 

1934 births
Living people
Belgian male field hockey players
Olympic field hockey players of Belgium
Field hockey players at the 1956 Summer Olympics
Field hockey players at the 1960 Summer Olympics
Field hockey players at the 1964 Summer Olympics
Field hockey players at the 1968 Summer Olympics
People from Ixelles
Field hockey players from Brussels